Iceland has a rich literary history, which has carried on into the modern period.

Some of the best known examples of Icelandic literature are the Sagas of Icelanders. These are prose narratives based on historical events that took place in Iceland and the surrounding areas during the Saga Age. Most of these sagas were recorded during the 13th and 14th centuries, but the original authors and subsequent recorders of the works are unknown and thus not listed here. Although it has been suggested that Snorri Sturluson is the author of Egil's Saga. The Saga tradition is not limited only to Iceland, and is an integral part of Norse mythology throughout the Nordics.

Another dominant form of Icelandic literature is poetry. Iceland has a rich history of poets, with many poets listed here. The early poetry of Iceland is Old Norse poetry, which is divided into the anonymous Eddic poetry, and the Skaldic poetry attributed to a series of skalds, who were court poets who lived in the Viking Age and Middle Ages. The modern Icelandic language is sufficiently similar to the Old Norse language for speakers of modern Icelandic to be able to understand Old Norse texts. Later Icelandic poetry includes the Passion Hymns by Hallgrímur Pétursson, a collection of Christian religious poetry published in 1666. Modern poets include Einar Benediktsson, a neo-Romantic poet who was an important figure in Iceland's nationalistic literary revival during the 19th century, and 20th-century poets such as Tómas Guðmundsson and Davíð Stefánsson.

Halldór Laxness is the only Icelander to have been awarded the Nobel Prize. Winner of the Nobel Prize in Literature in 1955, he is recognized as one of Iceland's greatest literary figures. He wrote poetry, newspaper articles, plays, travelogues, short stories, and novels. Icelandic authors have won the Nordic Council's Literature Prize nine times.

In the modern period many Icelandic authors have been successful writing in languages other than Icelandic. Others have their work translated into other languages and are known internationally. The Detective Erlendur series by crime fiction author Arnaldur Indriðason is translated into at least 24 languages, including English.

Following is a list of notable Icelandic writers. This list includes authors of Icelandic literature, as well as writers in other literary disciplines; such as authors of fiction and non-fiction works, poets and skalds, playwrights, screenwriters, songwriters and composers, scholars, scribes, journalists, translators, and editors of newspapers and magazines. All the people listed here are or were Icelandic citizens, or writers with a strong connection to Iceland, for example by writing in the Icelandic language. People listed are from a wide range of time periods, ranging from the early Viking-age chroniclers, to modern day novelists. To help sort the writers by period, they are sorted according to the time period they lived. Although many more precise periods can be used, this list uses Contemporary for living writers, Modern for writers since the 16th century, and Medieval for the period from the 5th to the 15th century. In keeping with Icelandic naming conventions, the list is alphabetical by given name, as that is how Icelandic names are sorted.

A

Á

B

D

E

F

G

H

I

Í

J

K

L

M

N

O

Ó

Ö

P

R

S

T

Þ

U

V

Y

See also

 List of Icelandic women writers
 Icelandic literature
 Culture of Iceland
 Icelandic language
 Sagas of Icelanders

References

Footnotes

Citations

External links 

 Icelandic language Wikisource
 The Writers' Union of Iceland official website
 In Iceland, a Literary Tour Explores Rich History
 Primary Documents

Iceland
 
Writers